Ella Lonn (1879 – 1962) was a scholar of American history in the United States. She wrote about desertion during the American Civil War, foreigners role in the conflict, and the Reconstruction era.

She studied at the University of Chicago and the University of Pennsylvania.

Books
 Reconstruction in Louisiana After 1868 (1918)  New York : G.P. Putnam's Sons, 1918.
 Women's Colleges And Americanization (1920)
 The Government of Maryland (1921)
 Conservation of the products of the Chesapeake Bay; under the auspices of the Central (Baltimore) district of the Maryland federation of women's clubs (1924)
 Desertion During the Civil War (1928) San Francisco : Golden Springs Publishing, 2016.
 Salt as a Factor in the Confederacy (1933)  University of Alabama Press, 1965
 Foreigners in the Confederacy (1940)  Greenwood Press, [1969, ©1951]
 The colonial agents of the southern colonies (1945) Gloucester, Mass., P. Smith, 1965 [©1945]
 Foreigners in the Union Army and Navy (1950)

References

Further reading
 The path they blazed : biographical sketches of the first three women presidents of the Southern Historical Association : Ella Lonn, Kathryn Trimmer Abbey Hanna, and Mary Elizabeth Massey'' by Anne Murray Lisk, Winthrop University M.A. dissertation, (1999)

1879 births
1962 deaths
American women historians
Historians of the American Civil War
African-American historians
American historians
University of Chicago alumni
University of Pennsylvania alumni